Marvin Owusu (born 11 July 2003) is a Ghanaian footballer who currently plays as a forward for Ghana Premier League side WAFA.

Career 
Owusu started his career with West African Football Academy, he was promoted to the senior team in October 2019 ahead of the 2019–20 Ghana Premier League season. On 12 January 2020 in a goalless draw against Elmina Sharks, he was brought on in the  69th minute to for Eric Asamany make his debut. The following match he started his first match in a goalless draw against Accra Hearts of Oak. He subsequently played one more match before the league was halted and later cancelled due to the COVID-19 pandemic in Ghana, ending his season with three league appearances. He was given the number 9 jersey and named on the squad list ahead of the 2020–21 season. He scored his professional debut goal on 31 January 2021, scoring the 2nd goal from an Augustine Boakye assist to help WAFA to a 5–0 victory over Liberty Professionals. He ended his season with seven league matches and scored one goal.

References

External links 

 

Living people
2003 births
Association football midfielders
Ghanaian footballers